Allen Michael Chastanet (born 20 November 1960) is a Saint Lucian businessman and politician who served as Prime Minister of Saint Lucia from 2016 to  2021. He is currently the Opposition Leader of Saint Lucia and the political leader of the United Workers Party as well as the parliamentary representative for Micoud South constituency.

Education
In 1979, Chastanet graduated from high school at Stanstead College in Stanstead, Quebec. He holds a B.A. degree from Bishop's University and an MSc degree from American University.

Business career
Chastanet worked as vice president of marketing and sales for Air Jamaica. He is the managing director of the Coco Palm Hotel in Rodney Bay.

Political career

Chastanet was Minister for Tourism and Civil Aviation and a member of the Saint Lucian Senate from 2006 to 2011.  Chastanet unsuccessfully ran for a parliament seat for Soufriere Constituency in the 2011 general election. In 2013, he was elected leader of the opposition United Workers Party. Chastanet won the parliament seat for Micoud South constituency in the 2016 general election. He was sworn in as Prime Minister on 7 June 2016.

His government is aligned with that of the United States in international relations. On Venezuela, he refuses to recognize President Nicolas Maduro and supports Juan Guaido, a opposition leader. He and other pro-US Caribbean leaders have been summoned to a meeting with Donald Trump in March 2019 to define a common policy on the situation in Venezuela and China's "predatory economic practices".

His government's mismanagement of the economy is pointed to by a report from the Central Bank of the Eastern Caribbean, which cites an explosion in debt. Saint Lucia has become the most indebted country in the Organization of Eastern Caribbean States.

On 26 July 2021, Chastanet and his political party United Workers Party were not successful in the 2021 Saint Lucian general election after they were defeated by the Saint Lucia Labour Party by a landslide.

Political positions
In April 2022, Chastanet stated his support for Saint Lucia to become a republic.

Personal life
Chastanet is the son of businessman Michael Chastanet. Allen Chastanet is married to attorney-at-law Raquel DuBoulay-Chastanet. They have two children.

See also
List of foreign ministers in 2017
List of current foreign ministers

References

Living people
1960 births
American University alumni
Bishop's University alumni
Foreign Ministers of Saint Lucia
Government ministers of Saint Lucia
Hoteliers
Members of the Senate of Saint Lucia
Prime Ministers of Saint Lucia
Saint Lucian businesspeople
Tourism ministers
United Workers Party (Saint Lucia) politicians
Stanstead College alumni
Saint Lucian republicans